The United States District Court for the Western District of Kentucky (in case citations, W.D. Ky.) is the federal district court for the western part of the state of Kentucky.

Appeals from the Western District of Kentucky are taken to the United States Court of Appeals for the Sixth Circuit (except for patent claims and claims against the U.S. government under the Tucker Act, which are appealed to the Federal Circuit).

Jurisdiction 
Jurisdiction includes the following Kentucky counties:  Adair, Allen, Ballard, Barren, Breckinridge, Bullitt, Butler, Caldwell, Calloway, Carlisle, Casey,  Christian, Clinton, Crittenden, Cumberland, Daviess, Edmonson, Fulton, Graves, Grayson, Green,  Hancock, Hardin, Hart, Henderson, Hickman, Hopkins, Jefferson, LaRue, Livingston, Logan, Lyon, Marion, Marshall, McCracken, McLean, Meade, Metcalfe, Monroe, Muhlenberg, Nelson, Ohio, Oldham, Russell, Simpson, Spencer, Taylor, Todd, Trigg, Union, Warren, Washington, and Webster.

The following counties are in the Louisville Division: Breckinridge,  Bullitt, Hardin, Jefferson, LaRue, Marion, Meade,  Nelson, Oldham, Spencer, and Washington.

The following counties are in the Bowling Green Division: Adair,  Allen, Barren, Butler, Casey, Clinton, Cumberland, Edmonson, Green, Hart, Logan, Metcalf, Monroe, Russell, Simpson,  Taylor, Todd, and Warren.

The following counties are in the Owensboro Division: Daviess, Grayson, Hancock, Henderson, Hopkins, McLean, Muhlenberg, Ohio, Union, and Webster.

The following counties are in the Paducah Division: Ballard, Caldwell, Calloway, Carlisle, Christian, Crittenden, Fulton, Graves, Hickman, Livingston, Lyon, McCracken, Marshall, and Trigg.

History 
The United States District Court for the District of Kentucky was one of the original 13 courts established by the Judiciary Act of 1789, on September 24, 1789. At the time, Kentucky was not yet a state, but was within the territory of the state of Virginia. The District was unchanged when Kentucky became a state on June 1, 1792. On February 13, 1801 the Judiciary Act of 1801, abolished the U.S. district court in Kentucky, but the repeal of this Act restored the District on March 8, 1802, .

Meeting places 
The court is based in Louisville and  also holds sessions in federal courthouses in Bowling Green, Owensboro, and Paducah. The United States Court of Appeals for the Sixth Circuit in Cincinnati, Ohio maintains appellate jurisdiction over the district.  Its court in Louisville is located at the Gene Snyder U.S. Courthouse.

U.S. Attorney 
The United States Attorney's Office for the Western District of Kentucky represents the United States in civil and criminal litigation in the court. As of  the United States Attorney is Michael A. Bennett.

Current judges 
:

Former judges

Chief judges

Succession of seats

See also 
 Courts of Kentucky
 List of current United States district judges
 List of United States federal courthouses in Kentucky

References

External links 
 U.S. District Court for the Western District of Kentucky, Official website

1789 establishments in Virginia
1802 establishments in Kentucky
1901 establishments in Kentucky
Kentucky, Western District
Kentucky law
Infrastructure in Louisville, Kentucky
Bowling Green, Kentucky
Owensboro, Kentucky
Paducah, Kentucky
Courthouses in Kentucky